John Austin  (born July 31, 1957) is an American  former professional tennis player born in Long Beach, California.  He won the Wimbledon mixed doubles championship with his sister, Tracy Austin, in 1980, becoming the first brother and sister team to win a Grand Slam title together.

Austin reached a career high singles ranking of world No. 40. He now resides in Los Angeles with his son, Reed, and his wife, Karen. He is the brother of former professional tennis players Tracy, Pam, Jeff, and Doug Austin, and the brother-in-law of fitness expert Denise Austin.

According to a July 31, 2006 press release,
 He is currently the head pro of the Mulholland Tennis Club in Los Angeles
 He was the national NCAA doubles champ in 1978 while at UCLA
 He was a Davis Cup team member.

Grand Slam finals

Mixed doubles: 2 (1 title, 1 runner–up)

External links 
 
 

American male tennis players
Tennis players from Long Beach, California
UCLA Bruins men's tennis players
Wimbledon champions
1957 births
Living people
Place of birth missing (living people)
Grand Slam (tennis) champions in mixed doubles